In library science, special collections (Spec. Coll. or S.C.) are libraries or library units that house materials requiring specialized security and user services.

Materials housed in special collections can be in any format (including rare books, manuscripts, photographs, archives, ephemera, and digital records), and are generally characterized by their artifactual or monetary value, physical format, uniqueness or rarity, and/or an institutional commitment to long-term preservation and access. They can also include association with important figures or institutions in history, culture, politics, sciences, or the arts.

Individual libraries or archival institutions determine for themselves what constitute their own special collections, resulting in a somewhat mutable definition. For research libraries, a special collections area or division can be a fundamental part of their mission. Some special collections are standalone institutions that are privately funded, such as the Newberry Library or the American Antiquarian Society while others are part of a larger institution, such as the Beinecke Library at Yale University. Many American university special collections grew out of the merging of rare book rooms and manuscripts departments in a university's library system.

In contrast to general (or circulating) libraries, the uniqueness of special collections means that they are not easily replaced (if at all) and therefore require a higher level of security and handling. When such security fails, it can be catastrophic. The Carnegie Library of Pittsburgh's rare books and archives were silently breached from the inside by the manager of the Oliver Room, Greg Priore.

Function
The primary function of a special collections division is to foster research by providing researchers access to items while ensuring their longevity. Many staff members involved with special collections have either advanced degrees or specialized training related to the collections for which they are responsible.

Storage
Items in a special collection are usually stored in closed stacks (not directly accessible to library patrons) which contain noncirculating items, meaning that items cannot be loaned or otherwise removed from the premises. Access to materials is usually under supervision. Depending on the policies of an institution holding special collections, researchers may be asked to present identification cards, letters of reference, or other credentials to gain access.

Most special collections are stored in areas in which the temperature, humidity, illumination, and other environmental conditions are carefully monitored to ensure the integrity of materials, and adequate security is provided to protect the materials from unauthorized access, theft, and vandalism.

Offsite storage facilities have become increasingly popular among institutions holding special collections. Most libraries consider it their mandate to maintain acquisition of new collections, although the limitations of their physical plants may not be able to handle all that is acquired. Storing materials offsite allows flexibility in how libraries design and apportion their space and provides security for materials.  The 2010 "Taking Our Pulse" report cites a survey in which 67% of responding institutions use offsite facilities, with another 5% in planning stages.

Reading room characteristics
Special reading rooms are often provided to minimize the risk to holdings while being consulted by patrons, which are sometimes monitored by library personnel who also provide reference assistance and relay requests for materials. Rules often apply to use of materials in order to protect against inadvertent damage; Writing implements which use ink are very commonly prohibited, as well as flash photography, use of mobile phones, and the presence of food and beverages. Protective gloves are sometimes required when consulting particularly delicate materials, photographs, and metal objects, and many libraries may require that books be read only while resting in special cradles.

See also
 Archive
 Manuscript
 Book collecting
 Cultural heritage
 Historic preservation
 Primary source
 Born-digital 
 Bibliography
 Historical society
 List of closed stack libraries

References

Bibliography

Library resources
Archival science
 
Collections